Oryctanthus is a genus of flowering plants belonging to the family Loranthaceae.

Its native range is Mexico to Tropical America.

Species:

Oryctanthus alveolatus 
Oryctanthus asplundii 
Oryctanthus callicarpus 
Oryctanthus cordifolius 
Oryctanthus costulatus 
Oryctanthus florulentus 
Oryctanthus grammatus 
Oryctanthus grandis 
Oryctanthus guianensis 
Oryctanthus minor 
Oryctanthus neurophyllus 
Oryctanthus occidentalis 
Oryctanthus ovalifolius 
Oryctanthus pedunculatus 
Oryctanthus phthirusoides 
Oryctanthus spicatus 
Oryctanthus tehuacanensis

References

Loranthaceae
Loranthaceae genera